The Canton of Le Thillot is a French administrative and electoral grouping of communes in the Vosges département of eastern France and in the region of Grand Est.

Positioned within the Arrondissement of Épinal, the canton has its administrative centre at Le Thillot.

Composition
At the French canton reorganisation which came into effect in March 2015, the canton was expanded from 8 to 10 communes:
 Bussang 
 Dommartin-lès-Remiremont
 Ferdrupt
 Fresse-sur-Moselle 
 Le Ménil 
 Ramonchamp 
 Rupt-sur-Moselle 
 Saint-Maurice-sur-Moselle 
 Le Thillot 
 Vecoux

References

Cantons of Vosges (department)